WKWK-FM is an adult contemporary formatted broadcast radio station licensed to Wheeling, West Virginia, United States, serving the Wheeling/Steubenville area. WKWK is owned and operated by iHeartMedia, Inc. The station carries Murphy, Sam and Jodi in mornings and Delilah at night. Dana Tyson in middays afternoons are hosted locally by Vice President of Programming Chris Kelly, and overnights by Dana McKay. All music heard on the station is programmed at the corporate level by Premium Choice.

References

External links

KWK-FM
IHeartMedia radio stations
Radio stations established in 1948
1948 establishments in West Virginia